Cossi Houegban (born 11 July 1964) is a Beninese former cyclist. He competed in the individual road race at the 1992 Summer Olympics.

References

1964 births
Living people
Beninese male cyclists
Olympic cyclists of Benin
Cyclists at the 1992 Summer Olympics
Place of birth missing (living people)